Ackman is a surname. People with this surname include:

 Alyson Ackman (born 1993), Canadian swimmer
 Amy Vera Ackman, also known as Mother Giovanni (1886–1966), Australian hospital administrator
 Bill Ackman (born 1966), American hedge fund manager
 Margaret Ackman, Guyanese politician
 Robert Ackman (1927–2013), Canadian chemistry professor

See also
 Go! Go! Ackman, a manga series